Gerald Wyatt (4 June 1933 – 19 June 2001) was an English cricketer  who played for Derbyshire on various occasions between 1954 and 1960.

Wyatt was born in New Mills, Derbyshire. He joined Derbyshire and began playing in the Second XI in 1950. He made his first-class debut for Derbyshire in the 1954 season in June when he kept wicket in the match while regular keeper George Dawkes was injured. He made four first-class appearances in the 1955 season, making a top score of 31 runs. He made no first-class cricketing appearances for three seasons when he played regularly in the Second XI. He returned to the Derbyshire first team in the 1958 season when he batted in nine innings, and scored his only first-class half-century, against Oxford University. He played no further Second XI cricket beyond this point, and played just a single first-class match in the 1960 season against Oxford University when he did not score in either innings.

Wyatt was wicket-keeper and a right-handed batsman and averaged 11.50 from 20 first-class innings.

Wyatt died in Stockport at the age of 68.

References

1933 births
2001 deaths
English cricketers
Derbyshire cricketers